The Montreal City Hockey League (MCHL) was a Canadian amateur senior ice hockey league in Montreal, Quebec which ran for 14 consecutive seasons between 1910 and 1924 when it merged with the Eastern Canada Amateur Hockey League.

A rivaling senior amateur league called the Montreal Hockey League (MHL) ran simultaneously with the MCHL for seven seasons between 1913 and 1920.

The amateur teams in Montreal did not follow strict rules of player residency and were thus not eligible to compete for the Allan Cup as Canadian amateur champions against teams from other provinces, so instead the Art Ross Trophy was introduced as a challenge trophy between the champion teams from the various amateur leagues in the city. The trophy was competed for from 1913–1920.

Champions
1910–11: Montreal Garnets
1911–12: Montreal Garnets
1912–13: Montreal Champêtre
1913–14: Montreal Victorias
1914–15: Montreal HC
1915–16: Montreal HC
1916–17: Loyola College
1917–18: McGill University
1918–19: Montreal Canada Vickers
1919–20: Montreal Victorias
1920–21: McGill University
1921–22: Montreal St. Ann's
1922–23: Montreal Nationals
1923–24: Montreal St. Ann's

Source: Society for International Hockey Research (sihrhockey.org)

References

Defunct ice hockey leagues in Canada